In broadcasting, a trimulcast is a cluster of three radio stations and/or translators that play the same feed. Normally this is done in order to have full coverage of a certain area. Some stations use this technique to provide rimshot coverage into a major market by broadcasting on the outskirts from three different locations, or combine multiple low power television stations in an attempt to provide the equivalent coverage of one full-power station.

Examples
WGVX/WLUP/WWWM in Minneapolis, Minnesota make up Soft AC station Love 105 FM.
KRXV, KHWY, and KHYZ cover the Mojave Desert from Barstow to Laughlin and Las Vegas, Nevada; they target listeners travelling to the two cities on Interstate 15 and Interstate 40 from Southern California, with their advertising 
KBPI/KBPL/K300CP on 107.9 frequency cover the Colorado Interstate 25 corridor.
In 1996, WBMA-LP/WCFT-TV/WJSU-TV formed a television trimulcast in the Anniston/Birmingham/Tuscaloosa, Alabama area to replace WBRC as the market's ABC affiliate when it switched to Fox. While owner Allbritton Communications had acquired the full-powered WCFT and WJSU in Tuscaloosa and Aniston to serve as a simulcast covering the region, at the time Nielsen regarded all three cities as separate media markets—meaning that they were both considered out-of-market stations in Birmingham (and thus ineligible to be counted in local ratings). As a workaround WBMA-LP was added to the arrangement, and classified as the originating station for WCFT and WJSU.

References

Radio broadcasting